{{Infobox person
| name   = Misaki  Wayengera
| image =
| image_size     = 
| caption  = 
| birth_date  =  
| birth_place = Mbale Hospital, Uganda
| death_date  = 
| death_place = 
| alma_mater         = Makerere University,  University of Toronto, Makerere University, Emory University,  National Human Genome Research Institute(Post-doctoral fellowship in Human Genetics & Genomics), (Joint PhD in Pathogen Omics)Makerere UniversityYale University,  National Institute for Communicable Diseases| occupation                = Physician,  researcher, academic administrator 
| years_active              = 2004— present
| nationality               = Ugandan
| citizenship               = Uganda
| known_for                 = Medical research, academic administration
| networth                  = 
| title                     = 
}}Misaki Wayengera''' is a Ugandan physician, academician, and a medical researcher. He serves as a lecturer for Pathology, Immunology and Molecular Biology at Makerere University College of Health Sciences. He is the chairperson of Uganda's Scientific Advisory Committee on COVID-19 for the Ministry of Health and the National Task Force.

Background
He was born on 15 October 1979 at Mbale Hospital, in Mbale District.

Education
Misaki  was educated at North Road Primary School in Mbale District from 1987 to 1992, he joined Nabumali High School for UCE (1993-1996), he attended King's College Budo for UACE (1997-1998). In 1999, Wayengera entered the Makerere University School of Medicine where he obtained the Bachelor of Medicine and Human Surgery graduating in 2004, he went on to obtain the Master of  Medicine degree specializing in Immunology also from Makerere in 2013. He later obtained a joint PhD degree in Pathogenomics from Makerere and Yale University in  2018. He his a fellow of Human Genetics & Genomics since 2017 from the National Human Genome Research Institute. Following completion of his medical studies in 2004,  Wayengera went for a bio-entrepreneurship training at the Medical and Related Sciences (MaRs) Discovery District at the University of Toronto Misaki has obtained several post graduate certificates such as  a Certificate in Bioentreprenuership from University of Toronto, Certicate in Vaccinology from Oxford University  (2014), Certificate in Research and Diagnostics Development from Emory University  (2017),  a post Doc in Filovirogy from the National Institute for Communicable Diseases,  South Africa  (2019). He has special training in Immunology, Vaccinology, Clinical Microbiology, Filovirology and Genetics.

Work experience

Wayengera started as an intern doctor at Mulago Hospital in 2004, and has worked as a Researcher assistant at Makerere University Retreatment TB Project (2004-2007), as an assistant lecturer of Genetics in the Department of Pathology at  Makerere University School of Medicine (2007-2014), as a company  Director at Restrizymes Biotherapeutics Uganda Limited in  Kampala (2008-2020), as  Ex-Chairperson for  Education and Coordinated Training Working Group (ECTWG)- H3Africa  Consortium (2013-2016), as Lecturer for  Genetics & Genomics Deptment  of Pathology at  Makerere University College of Health Sciences since 2014. 
In 2013, he won a $100,000 grant from Grand Challenges Canada to create the Pan-Filovirus Rapid Diagnostic Test, a paper-strip test used in detecting Ebola and Marburg viruses. He is a  researcher and inventor of the Pan-Filovirus Rapid Diagnostic Test (Pan-filo-V RDT). In 2014, when the Ebola epidemic broke out in West Africa,  Wayengera and his team were very pivotal in its control. He served as In-charge of Unit of Genetics & Genomics (a specialized referral centre for children and adults born with rare Mendelian diseases at Mulago Hospital. He is the chairperson of Uganda's Scientific Advisory Committee on COVID-19 for the Ministry of Health and the National Task Force.

Research
He has  published the finding of his research on pathogen OMICS:- with a focus on
identifying new molecular targets for research and development of diagnostics, therapeutics and
vaccines in medical journals and other peer publications hence cited with an H-Index of 36 with 321 citations in over 120 peer-reviewed journal in scientific publications.

Awards
In 2015,  he was listed   57 out of  100 most influential Africans (Science & Technology Track),in the  New African Magazine.
In 2019, he was among the  30 finalists of the World Health Organization Innovation Challenge.

Committee memberships
Wayengera is  a member of  various organisations such as
 Member at  Association of Pathologists of East, Central and Southern Africa-APECSA
 Member of International AIDS Society (IAS)
 Member of  Alliance for Microbicide Development
 Member of  African Society for Human Genetics (AfSHG)
 Member of YECI-Steering Committee, Global HIV vaccine Enterprise
Member of  IAS “Towards an HIV cure” group
 Member of  H3Africa Consortium (funded by NIH, Wellcome Trust)
 Member of the 50 Scientists’ Advisory Committee for the African Network for New Diagnostic Innovation (ANDI) Pre-Symposium to the African Union Heads of State meeting on Ebola and other disease Technologies.

References

External links
Ugandan doctor behind revolutionary Ebola diagnostic kit
Dr. Misaki Wayengera • WHO | Regional Office for Africa
Members Education and Coordinated Training Working Group
Scientists reject Mulago calls to lift lockdown
How I made an Ebola rapid detector test: an interview with Dr. Misaki Wayengera, Part I

Living people
1980 births
Makerere University alumni
Ugandan epidemiologists
People from Wakiso District
People from Central Region, Uganda
Ugandan pathologists
21st-century Ugandan physicians